Louise Hunt may refer to:
 Louise Hunt (coroner), British coroner
 Louise Hunt (tennis) (born 1991), British wheelchair tennis player